Cristóbal López is an Argentine businessman, close to Kirchnerism. He owns the TV channel C5N, Radio 10 and other four radios.

References

Argentine businesspeople
Living people
Kirchnerism
1956 births